The Last Ride is a 2011 American drama about the last days of country music pioneer and legend Hank Williams. The film stars Henry Thomas, Jesse James, and Fred Dalton Thompson, and received a limited release on October 21, 2011.

Despite the content, no recordings by Williams are ever played during the film. The soundtrack is composed of covers of Williams' songs among other country musicians.

Plot
The film centers around the final days of Hank Williams' life when he was being driven by a young auto mechanic to his New Year's Eve shows in West Virginia and Ohio. The film chronicles their relations, their adventures, and Williams' personal problems, which later resulted in his death on January 1, 1953.

Principal Cast
 Henry Thomas as Hank Williams/"Mr. Wells"/Luke
 Jesse James as Silas
 Fred Thompson as O'Keefe
 Kaley Cuoco as Wanda
 Stephen Tobolowsky as Ray
 Ray McKinnon as Stan
 James Hampton as Judge Matheny

Soundtrack
The soundtrack was released under Curb Records, the company that also employed Williams' son Hank Williams, Jr. and his grandson Hank Williams III up until 2011.

 The Last Ride Theme – Benjy Gaither
 Hey Good Lookin' – Jett Williams
 Honky Tonk Man – Russ Taff
 Keep on the Sunny Side – Rebecca Frazier
 I Will Marry You – Wes Hampton
 It Wasn't God Who Made Honky Tonk Angels – Sarah Johns
 Cold, Cold Heart – Doug Anderson
 The Swing Low Sweet Chariot – Clyde Wright & The Incredible Golden Gates
 I'm So Lonesome I Could Cry – Michael English
 Longing – Jett Williams
 Footprints – Benjy Gaither
 I'm Winging My Way Back Home – The Blackwood Brothers
 Can't Help It If I'm Still in Love with You – Jett Williams
 On I Down the Road – Val Storey
 Chino – Nathan Young
 Ilene – Nathan Young
 What Ya Gonna Do – Nathan Young
 Tennessee Waltz – Nathan Young
 O Come Angel Band – The Isaacs
 Hank Williams' Blues – Jett Williams
 The Night Hank Williams Came to Town – Johnny Cash & Waylon Jennings
 The Last Ride – Tony Ramey

Reception
On review aggregator Rotten Tomatoes, the film holds an approval rating of 47% based on 19 reviews, with an average rating of 5.48/10.

References

External links

2011 films
American drama films
2011 drama films
Biographical films about singers
2010s English-language films
Films directed by Harry Thomason
2010s American films